David Francis Murphy (May 4, 1876 – April 8, 1940), nicknamed "Dirty Dave", was a shortstop in Major League Baseball. He played for the Boston Beaneaters in 1905.

References

External links

1876 births
1940 deaths
Major League Baseball shortstops
Boston Beaneaters players
Baseball players from Massachusetts
Derby Angels players
New London Whalers players
Waterbury Rough Riders players
Norwich Reds players
New Bedford Whalers (baseball) players
Lawrence Colts players
People from Adams, Massachusetts
Sportspeople from Berkshire County, Massachusetts